Richard Temple West (1827 – 10 February 1893) was a prominent High Church English clergyman and academic in the 19th century.

Life
Richard Temple West was born in 1827. His father was a Commissioner in Bankruptcy, and his mother (Lady Maria Walpole) was a daughter of Horatio Walpole, 2nd Earl of Orford. His brother, Sir Algernon West, was Principal Private Secretary to Prime minister William Ewart Gladstone.

Richard West was educated at Christ Church, Oxford, and was appointed as a Student of Christ Church (the equivalent of a Fellow at other colleges) in 1848, a position that he held until 1875. He was ordained as a priest in the Church of England, and served as curate of a number of churches, including the London church of All Saints, Margaret Street. He was appointed as vicar of St Mary Magdalene, Paddington in 1865, where he remained until his death.  He was a High Church Anglican, and was described by The Times as "one of the most prominent and respected of the High Church clergy of the metropolis". He was a member of the governing council of Keble College, Oxford, from 1882 to 1893.  He died in Bournemouth on 10 September 1893.

References

1827 births
1893 deaths
19th-century English Anglican priests
Alumni of Christ Church, Oxford
Fellows of Christ Church, Oxford